Michael Smith is a journalist responsible for coverage of Latin America for Bloomberg Markets magazine.

He was a freelance journalist covering Chile.
He graduated from University of North Carolina.
He worked at the Daily Record in Morristown, New Jersey and the Associated Press.

He has three sons and lives in Santiago, Chile.
 
In 2022 he published his first book, co-authored with Jonathan Franklin, Cabin Fever: The Harrowing Journey of a Cruise Ship at the Dawn of a Pandemic about the Holland-America cruise ship MS Zaandam during the early days of the COVID-19 pandemic as it sought a friendly port from the tip of South America to Florida.

Awards
2005 George Polk award for Health Reporting, for "Big Pharma's Shameful Secret" 
2005 Investigative Reporters and Editors prize
2006 The Hillman Prize
2008 Maria Moors Cabot Prize winner 
2021 Gerald Loeb Award for Investigative business journalism for "Addicted to Profit", Bloomberg News

Work

References

American male journalists
Maria Moors Cabot Prize winners
Year of birth missing (living people)
University of North Carolina at Chapel Hill alumni
Living people
Associated Press reporters
George Polk Award recipients
Gerald Loeb Award winners for Investigative